The La Porte Civic Auditorium is an event building located in La Porte, Indiana. Opened in 1930, it has 7,600 square feet of space. It hosts athletic contests, weddings, concerts and stage plays. A few of the well-known artists that have performed at the auditorium include Ted Nugent, Alice Cooper, Ace Frehley, Stevie Ray Vaughan, Cheap Trick and Night Ranger.

References

External links
 Official website

Buildings and structures in LaPorte County, Indiana
Music venues in Indiana
1930 establishments in Indiana